In music, I–IV–V–I or IV–V–I is a chord progression and cadence that, "unequivocally defines the point of origin and the total system, the key." Composers often begin pieces with this progression as an exposition of the tonality:

According to theorist Oswald Jonas, "[a]long with motion toward the fifth (V), IV [the subdominant] appears as a corrective, depriving V (the dominant) of its independence and pointing it back in the direction of its origin [I]." In the key of C, IV provides the note F and eliminates the possibility of G major, which requires F. The progression is also often used at the end of works and sections.

See also
Predominant chord
Three-chord song
V–IV–I turnaround
ii–V–I progression
Ragtime progression

Sources

Cadences
Chord progressions